Edmund Wright (7 March 1902 – 1978) was an English professional football goalkeeper who played in the Football League for Brentford and Aston Villa.

Career statistics

References

1902 births
English footballers
English Football League players
Brentford F.C. players
Association football goalkeepers
Worcester City F.C. players
Aston Villa F.C. players
Footballers from Leytonstone
1978 deaths